Hampton Coliseum (Live 1981) is a live album by the Rolling Stones, released in 2012. It was recorded at the Hampton Coliseum in Hampton, Virginia on 18 December 1981, for what was the penultimate show of the band's U.S. tour that year. The show was the first-ever live pay-per-view broadcast of a music concert. The album was released exclusively as a digital download through Google Music on 30 January 2012.

The song list on this collection is nearly identical to that of Live at Leeds, another Rolling Stones live album released later in 2012 which documents the final show on the 1982 European leg of the same tour. This recording includes the songs "Waiting on a Friend" and "Let It Bleed;" the Leeds recording does not but does include "Angie," which does not appear here.

Two items of note from this performance: 1) While introducing the band, Mick Jagger leads the audience in an impromptu version of "Happy Birthday," in honor of Keith Richards turning 38 on this day. 2) Just over a minute into the final song "(I Can't Get No) Satisfaction", Richards had a memorable confrontation with a fan who jumped on stage. Without losing his composure, Richards moved in front of the charging fan, wielding his guitar like a baseball bat, then shoved the fan away from Jagger with his guitar until security guards could escort the intruder away. On this recording, Jagger can be heard singing through the whole episode, while Richards' guitar falls out for a few moments and some feedback can be heard. Richards then resumes playing, his instrument audibly unaffected by the rough contact it absorbed.

The 2-CD/DVD, single DVD and Blu-Ray for this concert was released on 3 November 2014 entitled, From The Vault – Hampton Coliseum – Live In 1981.

The album peaked at #120 on Billboards 200 chart.

Initially the Hampton Coliseum was not a scheduled stop on the Rolling Stones tour. Thanks to a grassroots campaign by local radio stations and petitions signed by thousands of area residents, the band added two Hampton shows to the itinerary.

Track listing

Personnel
Mick Jagger – vocals, guitar
Keith Richards – guitars, vocals & lead vocal track 17
Ronnie Wood – guitars, backing vocals
Bill Wyman – bass guitar
Charlie Watts – drums

Additional personnel
Ian Stewart – piano
Ian McLagan – keyboards, backing vocals
Ernie Watts – saxophone
Bobby Keys – tenor saxophone on "Let it Bleed", "Brown Sugar", "Tumbling Dice" and "Honky Tonk Woman"

References

1981 television specials
2012 live albums
2014 video albums
Live video albums
Eagle Rock Entertainment live albums
Eagle Rock Entertainment video albums
The Rolling Stones live albums
The Rolling Stones video albums